Edinburgh Southern is a constituency of the Scottish Parliament (Holyrood) covering part of the council area of Edinburgh. It elects one Member of the Scottish Parliament (MSP) by the plurality (first past the post) method of election. It is one of nine constituencies in the Lothian electoral region, which elects seven additional members, in addition to the nine constituency MSPs, to produce a form of proportional representation for the region as a whole.

The seat has been held by Daniel Johnson of Scottish Labour since the 2016 Scottish Parliament election.

Electoral region

The other eight constituencies of the Lothian region are Almond Valley, Edinburgh Central, Edinburgh Eastern, Edinburgh Northern and Leith, Edinburgh Pentlands, Edinburgh Western, Linlithgow and Midlothian North and Musselburgh.

The region includes all of the City of Edinburgh council area, parts of the East Lothian council area, parts of the Midlothian council area and all of the West Lothian council area.

Constituency boundaries and council area

Edinburgh is represented in the Scottish Parliament by six constituencies: Edinburgh Central, Edinburgh Eastern, Edinburgh Northern and Leith, Edinburgh Pentlands, Edinburgh Southern and Edinburgh Western.

The Edinburgh Southern constituency was created as a result of the First Periodic Review of Scottish Parliament Boundaries and largely replaced the Edinburgh South constituency.

For the 2011 Scottish Parliament election, Edinburgh South was redrawn and renamed "Edinburgh Southern". The electoral wards used in this seat are:

Fountainbridge/Craiglockhart, Morningside, Southside/Newington (shared with Edinburgh Central)
Liberton/Gilmerton, Portobello/Craigmillar (shared with Edinburgh Eastern)
Sighthill/Gorgie shared with (Edinburgh Central, Edinburgh Pentlands)

Constituency profile and voting patterns
Edinburgh Southern is an extremely affluent suburban constituency wedged across the inner south of the City of Edinburgh. The constituency is largely composed of leafy Victorian townhousing based around the suburbs of Newington, Morningside, Craiglockhart, Blackford and Merchiston, with some social housing in parts of Prestonfield and Liberton.

Edinburgh Southern has a colourful mix of political traditions, with the equivalent Edinburgh South constituency at Westminster being represented by the Conservatives until being won by Labour's Nigel Griffiths in 1987. It has since returned Labour MPs, becoming Labour's only Scottish constituency at Westminster in 2015 following a landslide election for the Scottish National Party, who took 56 of 59 Westminster constituencies in Scotland. At the Scottish Parliament, Edinburgh South returned a Labour constituency MSP in 1999, voting Liberal Democrat in both 2003 and 2007 before being narrowly won by the SNP in 2011. In 2016, it became Labour's only constituency seat gain at the Scottish Parliament, despite the fact that the Conservative Party had the largest share of the vote on the regional list vote in the constituency.

Member of the Scottish Parliament

Election results

2020s

2010s

References

External links

Scottish Parliament constituencies and regions from 2011
Constituencies of the Scottish Parliament
2011 establishments in Scotland
Constituencies established in 2011
Constituencies in Edinburgh